A by-election was held for the New South Wales Legislative Assembly electorate of Carcoar on 1 December 1881 because Ezekiel Baker was expelled from the Assembly on allegations of bribery and corruption.

Dates

Result

				

The sitting member Ezekiel Baker was expelled from the Assembly on allegations of bribery and corruption.

See also
Electoral results for the district of Carcoar
List of New South Wales state by-elections

References

1881 elections in Australia
New South Wales state by-elections
1880s in New South Wales